Takuhadachiji-hime, is a deity that appears in the creation story of the "Kojiki" and "Nihon Shoki." She is the daughter of the god Takamimusubi. She is the goddess of textiles and mother of Ninigi-no-Mikoto and Amenohoakari, and thus an ancestor of Jimmu.

The meaning of her name is not entirely clear, but "Takuhadachiji-hime" is believed to mean "many woven fabrics" or "many beautiful fabrics." There are also theories that the name refers to the deity as a skilled weaver or that it relates to the island of Toyoakitsu.

In the creation story, Takuhadachiji-hime is said to be a part of the pantheon of gods who descended from the heavens to create the world. The different texts give different genealogies and roles to the deity, but she is consistently represented as a divine being associated with creation and fertility.

In medieval times, she was associated with the Buddhist figure of the sixth heaven devil king and was worshiped in certain sects of Buddhism. The historical figure Oda Nobunaga is said to have held this deity in high esteem and even identified himself as its incarnation. With the separation of Buddhism and Shinto in the Meiji period, many temples dedicated to this deity were converted into Shinto shrines and their names were changed.

References 

Japanese goddesses
Amatsukami